Sinclair Programs was a magazine published in the United Kingdom, initially by ECC Publications of London and subsequently by EMAP. It was dedicated entirely to listings for programs for the Sinclair Research ZX80, ZX81 and ZX Spectrum computers, contributed by readers. The magazine was one of three launched in 1982 by ECC, the other two being Sinclair User and Sinclair Projects, the latter dedicated to hardware projects for the Sinclair computers. The magazine was published between May/June 1982 and September 1985.

References

External links
 Archived Sinclair Programs magazines on the Internet Archive

Monthly magazines published in the United Kingdom
Defunct computer magazines published in the United Kingdom
Magazines disestablished in 1985
Magazines established in 1982
ZX Spectrum magazines
1982 establishments in the United Kingdom
1985 disestablishments in the United Kingdom
Magazines published in London